The Journal of Civil Engineering and Management is a peer-reviewed scientific journal covering civil engineering published by Taylor & Francis on behalf of Vilnius Gediminas Technical University and the Lithuanian Academy of Sciences. It is an official journal of the International Council for Research and Innovation in Building and Construction.

External links 
 

Civil engineering journals
Taylor & Francis academic journals
Quarterly journals
English-language journals
Publications established in 1995
Vilnius Gediminas Technical University